Herbert Arthur Jordan (October 23, 1884 – June 2, 1973) was a Canadian amateur and later professional ice hockey player, most notably for the Quebec Bulldogs and the Renfrew Millionaires.

Playing career
Born in Quebec City, Quebec, Jordan made his way up to the Quebec Crescents of the Canadian Amateur Hockey League (CAHL) intermediates in 1900. He joined the Quebec HC of the CAHL seniors in 1902, and played for the organization until 1909, becoming a professional player in 1908–09 as the team and league (by then the Eastern Canada Amateur Hockey Association (ECAHA)) became professional. He played two seasons for the Renfrew Creamery Kings (dubbed the Millionaires) before retiring after the 1910 season when the Renfrew NHA team ceased operations.

He was a good scorer, and his best season was 1908–09, when he scored 30 goals in 12 games.

References

External links
Herb Jordan at JustSportsStats

1884 births
1973 deaths
Anglophone Quebec people
Canadian ice hockey centres
Ice hockey people from Quebec City
Quebec Bulldogs (NHA) players
Renfrew Hockey Club players